Andreas Hagen (born 16 February 1986) is a Norwegian footballer. Having had three spells in the Grimstad-based club, Hagen played in the 2013–14 Danish Superliga for Viborg FF. He was originally lured to Jerv by friend Knut Ugland.

Hagen is also capped for Norway on youth level.

References

1986 births
Living people
Footballers from Oslo
Norwegian footballers
Norway youth international footballers
Association football midfielders
Skeid Fotball players
FK Jerv players
Viborg FF players
Norwegian expatriate footballers
Expatriate men's footballers in Denmark
Norwegian expatriate sportspeople in Denmark
Norwegian First Division players
Danish 1st Division players
Danish Superliga players